Éléments de mathématique (English: Elements of Mathematics) is a series of mathematics books written by the pseudonymous French collective Nicolas Bourbaki.  Begun in 1939, the series has been published in several volumes, and remains in progress.  The series is noted as a large-scale, self-contained, formal treatment of mathematics.

The members of the Bourbaki group originally intended the work as a textbook on analysis, with the working title Traité d'analyse (Treatise on Analysis).  While planning the structure of the work they became more ambitious, expanding its scope to cover several branches of modern mathematics.  Once the plan of the work was expanded to treat other fields in depth, the title Éléments de mathématique was adopted.  Topics treated in the series include set theory, abstract algebra, topology, analysis, Lie groups and Lie algebras. 

The unusual singular "mathématique" (mathematic) of the title is deliberate, meant to convey the authors' belief in the unity of mathematics.  A companion volume, Éléments d'histoire des mathématiques (Elements of the History of Mathematics), collects and reproduces several of the historical notes which previously appeared in the work.

History

In late 1934, a group of mathematicians including André Weil resolved to collectively write a textbook on analysis.  They intended their work as a modern replacement for outdated texts—including one by Édouard Goursat—and also to fill a void in instructional material caused by the death of a generation of mathematics students in World War I.  The group adopted the collective pseudonym Nicolas Bourbaki, after the French general Charles-Denis Bourbaki.  During the late 1930s and early 1940s, the Bourbaki group expanded the plan of their work beyond analysis, and began publishing texts under the title Éléments de mathématique.

Volumes of the Éléments have appeared periodically since the publication of the first Fascicule ("Installment") in 1939 by Éditions Hermann, with several being published during the 1950s and 1960s, Bourbaki's most productive period and time of greatest influence.  Several years have sometimes passed before the publication of a new volume, and various factors have contributed to a slow pace of publication.  The group's working style is slow and rigorous, and a final product is not deemed acceptable unless it is unanimously approved by the group.  Further, World War II interrupted Bourbaki's activities during its early years.  In the 1970s a legal dispute arose with Hermann, the group's original publisher, concerning copyright and royalty payments.  The Bourbaki group won the involved lawsuit, retaining copyright over the work authored under the pseudonym, but at a price: the legal battle had dominated the group's attention during the 1970s, preventing them from doing productive mathematical work under the Bourbaki name.  Following the lawsuit and during the 1980s, publication of new volumes was resumed via Éditions Masson.  From the 1980s through the 2000s Bourbaki published very infrequently, with the result that in 1998 Le Monde pronounced the collective "dead". However, in the 2010s Bourbaki resumed publication of the Éléments with a revised and expanded edition of the eighth chapter of Algebra and a new book on algebraic topology, which had originally been planned as the eleventh chapter of the group's book on general topology.  Springer Verlag became Bourbaki's current publisher during the 21st century, reprinting the Éléments while also publishing new volumes.  Some early versions of the Éléments can be viewed at an online archive, and the mathematical historian Liliane Beaulieu has documented the sequence of publication.

The Éléments have had a complex publication history.  From the 1940s through the 1960s, Bourbaki published the Éléments in booklet form as small installments of individual chapters, known in the French as fascicules.  Despite having settled on a logical sequence for the work (see below), Bourbaki did not publish the Éléments in the order of its logical structure.  Rather, the group planned the arc of the work in broad strokes and published disparate chapters wherever they could agree on a final product, with the understanding that (logically) later chapters published (chronologically) first would ultimately have to be grounded in the later publication of logically earlier chapters.  The first installment of the Éléments to be published was the Summary of Results for the Theory of Sets in 1939; the first proper chapter of content on set theory—with proofs and theorems—did not appear until 1954.  Independently of the work's logical structure, The early fascicules were assigned chronological numberings by the publisher Hermann for historical reference.  Gradually, the small fascicules were collected and reprinted in larger volumes, forming the basis of the modern edition of the work.

The large majority of the Éléments has been translated into an English edition, although this translation is incomplete.  Currently the complete French edition of the work consists of 12 books printed in 29 volumes, with 73 chapters.  The English edition completely reproduces seven books and partially reproduces two, with three unavailable; it comprises 14 volumes, reproducing 58 of the original's 73 chapters.

Structure

Éléments de mathématique is divided into books, volumes, and chapters.  A book refers to a broad area of investigation or branch of mathematics (Algebra, Integration); a given book is sometimes published in multiple volumes (physical books) or else in a single volume.  The work is further subdivided into chapters with some volumes consisting of a single chapter.

Typically of mathematics textbooks, the Éléments''' chapters present definitions, mathematical notation, proofs of theorems and exercises, forming the core mathematical content of the work.  The chapters are supplemented by historical notes and summaries of results.  The former usually appear after a given chapter to contextualize the development of its topics,  and the latter are occasionally used sections in which a book's major results are collected and stated without proof.  Eléments d'histoire des mathématiques is a compilation volume of several of the historical note sections previously published in the Éléments proper, through the book on Lie groups and Lie algebras.

When Bourbaki's founders originally planned the Treatise on Analysis, they conceived of an introductory and foundational section of the text which would describe all prerequisite concepts from scratch.  This proposed area of the text was referred to as the "Abstract Packet" (Paquet Abstrait).  During the early planning stages the founders greatly expanded the scope of the abstract packet, with the result that it would require several volumes for its expression rather than a section or chapter in a single volume.  This portion of the Éléments was gradually realized as its first three books, dealing with set theory, abstract algebra, and general topology.

Today, the Éléments divide into two parts.  Bourbaki structured the first part of the work into six sequentially numbered books:  I. Theory of Sets, II. Algebra, III. General Topology, IV. Functions of a Real Variable, V. Topological Vector Spaces, and VI. Integration.  The first six books are given the unifying subtitle Les structures fondamentales de l’analyse (Fundamental Structures of Analysis), fulfilling Bourbaki's original intent to write a rigorous treatise on analysis, together with a thorough presentation of set theory, algebra and general topology.  

Throughout the Fundamental Structures of Analysis, any statements or proofs presented within a given chapter assume as given the results established in previous chapters, or previously in the same chapter.  In detail, the logical structure within the first six books is as follows, with each section taking as given all preceding material:

 I: Theory of Sets II (1): Algebra, chapters 1-3
 III (1): General Topology, chapters 1-3
 II (2): Algebra, from chapter 4 onwards
 III (2): General topology, from chapter 4 onwards
 IV: Functions of a Real Variable V: Topological Vector Spaces VI: IntegrationThus the six books are also "logically ordered", with the caveat that some material presented in the later chapters of Algebra, the second book, invokes results from the early chapters of General Topology, the third book.

Following the Fundamental Structures of Analysis, the second part of the Éléments consists of books treating more modern research topics: Lie Groups and Lie Algebras, Commutative Algebra, Spectral Theory, Differential and Analytic Manifolds, and Algebraic Topology.  Whereas the Éléments' first six books followed a strict, sequential logical structure, each book in the second part is dependent on the results established in the first six books, but not on those of the second part's other books.  The second part of the work also lacks a unifying subtitle comparable to the Fundamental Structures of Analysis.

Volumes

The Éléments are published in French and English volumes, detailed below.

See also
 Euclid's Elements
 Principia Mathematica''

Notes

References

Mathematics books